Southport is a community in Queens County, Prince Edward Island, Canada. Since April 1, 1995, when the Charlottetown Area Municipalities Act came into effect and created the town of Stratford, Southport has been part of Stratford.

Notable residents
Betty Jean Brown, registered nurse and political figure
George F. Dewar, physician and political figure

References

Communities in Queens County, Prince Edward Island
Former community municipalities in Prince Edward Island